The following is a list of caves in the Indian state of Maharashtra.

References 

Caves
Lists of tourist attractions in Maharashtra
Maharashtra